Patryk Fryc (born 24 February 1993 in Krosno) is a Polish footballer who plays as a right back for MKS Arłamów Ustrzyki Dolne.

Career
In January 2020, Fryc joined MKS Arłamów Ustrzyki Dolne.

References

External links

Polish footballers
Poland youth international footballers
Stal Mielec players
Flota Świnoujście players
Wisła Kraków players
Bruk-Bet Termalica Nieciecza players
Puszcza Niepołomice players
Olimpia Grudziądz players
Ekstraklasa players
I liga players
II liga players
1993 births
Living people
People from Krosno
Sportspeople from Podkarpackie Voivodeship
Association football defenders